Polupalli is a Census Town in Krishnagiri district, Tamil Nadu. Polupalli SIDCO Industrial Estate is located here. It is located North-West of Krishnagiri on  NH 7.

Demographics

 census, Polupalli had a population of 2,703 with 1393 males and 1310 females. The literacy rate is 70%, higher than the national average of 59.5%.

Economy and Industry

Polupalli is primarily an agricultural town with access to fresh water via the nearby river and mountain aquifers. The government has recently built a school, community hall, closed sewer system, and homes for the residents.

Collector V.K. Shanmugam inaugurated a new building of the Kasturba Gandhi Balika Vidyalaya at Polupalli. He has led an effort to eradicate female feticide in the district.

References

External links
Polupalli Kasturba Gandhi Balika Vidyalaya
Polupalli Industrial Estate

Villages in Krishnagiri district